José Antonio Velutini Ron (February 20, 1844 in Chaguaramal de Perales -today Zaraza-, Venezuela – November 8, 1912 in Caracas) was a military man, politician, diplomat, and a Venezuelan statesman. He held positions in Congress, was state president, ambassador, minister and vice president between 1871 and 1912. He received numerous awards for his political and military achievements.

Biography 
His family of Corsican origins moved to Barcelona in 1854. José Antonio studied in France between 1858 and 1863. On his return to Venezuela he began his public career under the protection of the Monagas family.

In 1871 he assumed the Barcelona state presidency. He was public credit and development minister during the second and third presidencies of Antonio Guzmán Blanco, respectively. He was appointed Commander in Chief of the Armies of the Republic on October 7, 1892 by Joaquín Crespo. He was the minister of finance in 1893.

He was the interior minister of Cipriano Castro and commander of government forces in the early stages of the Liberating Revolution. After the victorious campaign of the Castro government against the rebels, he was Plenipotentiary Minister for Debt Negotiations with various European nations and a Venezuelan ambassador in France and Britain.

He was Vice President of Venezuela from 1904 to 1905. Among his descendants are several prominent Venezuelan bankers and binanciers, such as Julio C. Velutini Couturier, Andrés Velutini Ruíz, Julio M. Herrera Velutini, and poet Juan Liscano.

References 

Finance ministers of Venezuela
Venezuelan politicians
Ambassadors of Venezuela
Venezuelan people of Corsican descent
1844 births
1912 deaths